The New Teacher is a 1939 Soviet comedy drama film directed by Sergey Gerasimov.

Plot 
A story about a young teacher who came to work in his native village, where he managed to win universal recognition and gain personal happiness. His students are not only children, but adults. Who created the world? How to become happy? Teacher Stepan Ivanovich is ready to answer all questions.

Cast 
 Boris Chirkov as Stepan Ivanovich Lautin
 Tamara Makarova as Agrafena  Grunya  Shumilina
 Lyudmila Shabalina as Mariya Ivanovna Lautina  
 Pavel Volkov as Ivan Fedorovich Lautin
 Valentina Telegina as Stepanida Ivanovna Lautina
 Vera Pomerants as Praskoviya Vasilyevna Lautina
 Ivan Nazarov as  Semyon Dimitrivich
 Mikhail Yekaterininsky as Dist. Chm. Aleksandr Sergeyevich Remizov  
 Nikolay Sunozov as Konstantin Alexeyvich Khudyakov  
 Aleksandra Matveeva as  Nastya

Awards 
 USSR State Prize II degree (Sergei Gerasimov; Tamara Makarova)

References

External links 

1939 films
1930s Russian-language films
Soviet comedy-drama films
1939 comedy-drama films
Lenfilm films
Soviet black-and-white films
Films directed by Sergei Gerasimov